Vett may refer to:

People
 Emil Vett (1843–1911), Danish businessman
 Vilhelm Vett (1879–1962), Danish sailor and Olympian

Other uses
 Vett, a character in the Canadian animated television series RollBots

See also
 The Del-Vetts, a 1963 American garage rock band
 Micro-Vett, a former Italian electric vehicle manufacturer
 Vet (disambiguation)
 Vette (disambiguation)